The Centro Ciudad Comercial Tamanaco is a 5,000 seat event center located in a popular shopping center in Caracas, Venezuela.

Events 

Events at the Terrace of the C.C.C.T:

Buildings and structures in Caracas
Tourist attractions in Caracas